Kamon may refer to:
Kamon (name)
Mon (emblem), also known as kamon (家紋), a Japanese heraldic symbol
Kamon, Israel, a village

See also
Camon (disambiguation)
Kumon (disambiguation)
Cimon (510–450 BC), Athenian politician and general